Émile Rumeau (23 December 1878 – 8 July 1943) was a French sport shooter. He was born in Port Said. He won silver medals at the 1920 Summer Olympics and at the 1924 Summer Olympics.

References

External links 
 
 

1878 births
1943 deaths
People from Port Said
French male sport shooters
Olympic shooters of France
Olympic silver medalists for France
Shooters at the 1920 Summer Olympics
Shooters at the 1924 Summer Olympics
Olympic medalists in shooting
Medalists at the 1920 Summer Olympics
Medalists at the 1924 Summer Olympics
20th-century French people
French expatriates in Egypt